Acupalpus inornatus is an insect-eating ground beetle of the Acupalpus genus. It is 3.5 to 4.2 millimeters long and reddish-brown or yellowish in color. It is shiny and iridescent.

References

inornatus
Beetles described in 1873